Robert Zeidman (born January 18, 1960) is an American electrical engineer and inventor. Zeidman has made contributions in Application Specific Integrated Circuit (ASIC) design, Field Programmable Gate Array (FPGA) design, embedded systems development, software synthesis, software analysis and software forensics. Best known for his pioneering contributions to the field of software forensics, Zeidman's research and development of software-forensics tools was instrumental in making detection of software source-code correlation practical and accurate, and in turning previously subjective information into empirical evidence. His book The Software IP Detective's Handbook, is considered the standard textbook for software forensics.

Zeidman is a senior member of the IEEE and was the recipient of the 1994 Wyle/EE Times American by Design Award, the 2003 Jolt Reader's Choice Award, the 2010 and the 2015 Outstanding Engineer Award from the IEEE Santa Clara Valley Section and from the Region 6 Central Area.

Early life and education
Zeidman was born and raised in Philadelphia, Pennsylvania. He earned bachelor's degrees in electrical engineering and physics from Cornell University in 1981 and a master's degree in electrical engineering from Stanford University in 1982.

Technology career
In October 1987, Zeidman founded the company Zeidman Consulting, which provides hardware and software design services, engineering support and expert witnesses for high-tech litigation. The company still operates with Zeidman as president. Zeidman's work there includes creating patented Molasses virtualization software that enables a slow speed hardware emulator or prototype to be attached to a high-speed network in order to emulate network hardware in a live system. Zeidman also consulted on court cases in disputed intellectual property, including Brocade v. A10 Networks, for which he testified at trial, ConnectU v. Facebook (on which the movie, The Social Network, is based), and Texas Instruments v. Samsung Electronics, which resulted in an award to his client of over $1 billion. Zeidman also developed the software tools, SynthOS and CodeSuite.

In January 1992, Zeidman invented remote backup and founded the company eVault Remote Backup Service. The company closed in April 1999 and the intellectual property became part of EVault, which was sold to Seagate Technology in 2007.

In January 1999, Zeidman founded The Chalkboard Network, which ran until December, 2002. The company featured business and engineering courses.

In December 2002, Zeidman founded Zeidman Technologies, which provides software tools for embedded software development. The company's patented product SynthOS software automatically synthesizes optimized source code for a custom real time operating system. The company operates with Zeidman as president.

In September 2007, Zeidman founded Software Analysis and Forensic Engineering Corporation, which provides software tools for intellectual property litigation. The company's main product is CodeSuite. The company operates with Zeidman as president.

In January 2011, Zeidman founded SamAnna Designs, which makes practical accessories. Its first product is the SamAnna Luxury Wallet.

In June 2012, Zeidman founded Swiss Creek Publications, an independent publisher, which published Zeidman's books: Introduction to Verilog, Just Enough Electronics to Impress Your Friends and Colleagues, The Amazing Adventure of Edward and Dr. Sprechtmachen, Horror Flick, and Good Intentions.

In December 2013, Zeidman founded Firtiva, a video-on-demand website to provide commercial-free content while sending second screen advertisements to a highly targeted audience.

Awards
1994 Wyle/EE Times American by Design Award
2003 Jolt Reader's Choice Award
2010 Outstanding Engineer Award from the IEEE Santa Clara Valley Section
2015 Outstanding Engineer Award from the IEEE Santa Clara Valley Section and from the Region 6 Central Area for his pioneering contributions to the field of software forensics.

Books
Zeidman is the author of five engineering books: 
“Introduction to Verilog” (1999) 
“Verilog Designer's Library” (2000) 
“Designing with FPGAs and CPLDs” (2002) 
“The Software IP Detective's Handbook” (2011) 
“Just Enough Electronics to Impress Your Friends and Colleagues” (2013)

Zeidman is the co-author of two engineering books: 
“Circuit Design: Know it All (Newnes Know it All)” (2008)
“FPGAs: World Class Designs” (2009)

References

External links
Official site

1960 births
Living people
Cornell University College of Engineering alumni
Stanford University alumni
21st-century American engineers